The 2008 Hazfi Cup Final was a two-legged football tie in order to determine the 2007–08 Hazfi Cup champion of Iranian football clubs. Esteghlal Tehran faced Pegah Gilan in this final game. The first leg took place on Jun 09, 2008 at 17:30 local time (UTC+3:30) at Sardar Jangal Stadium in Rasht and the second leg took place on Jun 16, 2008 at 17:00 local time (UTC+3:30) at Azadi Stadium, Tehran.

Format 
The rules for the final were exactly the same as the one in the previous knockout rounds. The tie was contested over two legs with away goals deciding the winner if the two teams were level on goals after the second leg. If the teams could still not be separated at that stage, then extra time would have been played with a penalty shootout (taking place if the teams were still level after extra time).

Route to the final

Final

Leg 1

Leg 2

Champions

See also 
 2007–08 Persian Gulf Cup
 2007–08 Azadegan League
 2007–08 Iran Football's 2nd Division
 2007–08 Iran Football's 3rd Division
 2007–08 Hazfi Cup
 Iranian Super Cup
 2007–08 Iranian Futsal Super League

2008
Haz
Esteghlal F.C. matches